Du'a Simat (Arabic: دعاء السمات), also known as Du'a Shobbur, is an Islamic supplication. This Du'a is mustahab (recommended) to be recited at sunset on Fridays. It is regarded as a prominent supplication. Most old Islamic scholars followed this practice. Muhammad al-Baqir, the fifth Imam of Shia Islam, said, 'I've spoken the truth if I swear to Allah that Ismul Azam is in this supplication." According to Allamah Mohammad Baqir Majlisi, the companions of the Prophet recited it regularly.

Naming 
Simāt is the plural form of Sīmah, which means sign. This supplication includes many signs of answering prayers.

Authenticity 
This supplication can be found in the books Misbah al-Mutahajjid by Sheikh Tusi, Jamal al-Esbu' by Sayyid ibn Tawus, al-Balad al-Amin by Kaf'ami, Bihar al-Anwar by Muhammad Baqir Majlisi and in prominent documents from Muhammad ibn Uthman Umri, one of the Four Deputies of Mahdi, and with the mediator from Ja'far al-Sadiq.

Text 
The initial (English translated) part of Du'a Simat is:

See also 
 Dua Ahd
 Du'a Kumayl
 Mujeer Du'a
 Jawshan Kabir
 Jawshan Saqeer
 Du'a Abu Hamza al-Thumali
 Ismul Azam

References

External links 
 Dua Simat
 The supplication of Simat

Shia Islam
Islamic prayer
Islamic terminology